Ad Dayr (الدير ) is a town of Basrah Governorate in southern Iraq, on the west bank of the Shatt Al-Arab River. The town has one of the few bridges over the Shatt Al-Arab. raq 
The area is close to the  Mesopotamian Marshes(Hammar Marshes), and has traditionally been home to many Marsh Arabs. 
The town has two mosques and a girls school and a holy shrine of Solomon. 

The area suffered greatly during the Iran–Iraq War, during which it was a major battlefield, and again after the 1991 Iraqi uprising.

References

Populated places in Basra Province